Marco Quotschalla (born 25 July 1988) is a football forward who is currently contracted with Luxembourgish second league club FC Rodange 91.

Career
Born in Cologne and raised in Pulheim, Quotschalla has played in the youth systems of Bayer 04 Leverkusen, 1. FC Köln, and Alemannia Aachen and played two matches for Aachen in the Bundesliga in the 2006–07 season. In January 2009, he left for Germania Dattenfeld. After half a season with Germania Dattenfeld, he signed with Bonner SC in the summer of 2009. After a successful season, he signed a two-year contract with FC Schalke 04 II on 25 July 2010. Eighteen months later, he signed for Wuppertaler SV, where he spent a year before joining SV Eintracht Trier 05 in January 2013. He was released by the club eighteen months later.

In July 2014 he was confirmed to have signed a contract with Italian Serie D club Orlandina, under the new guidance of head coach Viktor Pasulko.

References

External links
 Marco Quotschalla at kicker.de 

1988 births
Association football forwards
Living people
1. FC Köln players
German footballers
Alemannia Aachen players
Bonner SC players
FC Schalke 04 II players
Wuppertaler SV players
SV Eintracht Trier 05 players
Bundesliga players
Footballers from Cologne